Ernest Roscoe Dickerson (born June 25, 1951) is an American director, cinematographer, and screenwriter of film, television, and music videos.

As a cinematographer, he is known for his frequent collaborations with Spike Lee ever since they were classmates at the Tisch School of the Arts and worked together on Lee's 1983 master's degree thesis student film, Joe's Bed-Stuy Barbershop: We Cut Heads, which ultimately won a Student Academy Award. As a director, he is known for action and horror films such as Juice, Demon Knight, Bulletproof, Bones and Never Die Alone. He has also directed several episodes of acclaimed television series, including Once Upon a Time, The Wire, Dexter, The Walking Dead, and Godfather of Harlem.

Early life
Dickerson was born in Newark, New Jersey. He studied architecture at Howard University, but also took a film class with Haile Gerima as he already was interested in movies. He later relocated to New York City to attend New York University's film program at the Tisch School of the Arts, where he met fellow student Spike Lee. His first feature film as director of photography was also Lee's first film, Joe's Bed-Stuy Barbershop: We Cut Heads (1983), filmed while both of them were still students. Lee kept Dickerson in mind and he returned to work on a few more films as Spike Lee's cinematographer.

Career
After graduating, Dickerson began his career as cinematographer on music videos for Bruce Springsteen, Anita Baker, and Miles Davis, and went on to film John Sayles' Brother from Another Planet (1984), his first professional film as a director of photography.

While working on the first two seasons of George Romero’s television series Tales from the Darkside, Dickerson was a cameraman on John Jopson's concert film One Night with Blue Note (1985) and was later contacted by Spike Lee, who had found the budget to shoot his movie She's Gotta Have It (1986). Dickerson continued his collaboration with Lee on five more films, including  Do the Right Thing (1989). Their last collaboration was on Malcolm X in 1992, the same year Dickerson made his directing debut with the crime drama Juice. He also worked as a 2nd unit director on Lee's Miracle at St Anna (2008).

For television, Dickerson has directed several episodes of acclaimed shows such as Once Upon a Time, Dexter, The Walking Dead and Treme. A long time horror movie fan, he has also worked with Mick Garris on both Masters of Horror and Fear Itself and directed Demon Knight and Bones (2001).

Dickerson has always wanted to make films, and being a director himself has always been a dream of his. In an interview with The New York Times, he says: "I love to shoot, but directing is all about telling stories," he says. "And there are so many stories out there I want to tell."

The Wire

Dickerson joined the crew of the HBO drama The Wire as a director for the series' second season in 2003. He directed the episode "Bad Dreams". Reviewers drew comparisons between Spike Lee's films and The Wire even before Dickerson joined the crew. "Bad Dreams" was submitted to the American Film Institute for consideration in their TV programs of the year award and the show subsequently won the award. Following this success Dickerson returned as a director for the third season in 2004. He directed the episode "Hamsterdam" and the season finale "Mission Accomplished". In 2006 he contributed a further two episodes to the show's fourth season: "Misgivings" and the season finale "Final Grades". The fourth season received a second AFI Award and Dickerson attended the ceremony to collect the award. Showrunner David Simon has said that Dickerson is the show's directorial work horse and that he knows the show as well as the producers; Simon has praised Dickerson's directing saying that he "delivers each time".

Dickerson returned as a director for the series' fifth and final season in 2008 and helmed the episode "Unconfirmed Reports".

Later work
He would later work with David Simon again, directing several episodes of the New-Orleans based drama Treme, including the season 2 finale "Do Watcha Wanna", which won Dickerson a NAACP Image Award for Outstanding Directing in a Dramatic Series.

Dickerson also worked with Executive Producer and writer Eric Overmyer on both The Wire and Treme. Dickerson directed the episode "Fugazi" for Overmyer's series Bosch in 2014.

Filmography

Television

Director

Cinematographer

Film

Director

Cinematographer

References

External links
 
 Ernest Dickerson interview about Mo' Better Blues.

1951 births
Living people
African-American film directors
African-American television directors
American cinematographers
American film directors
American television directors
Horror film directors
Howard University alumni
Artists from Newark, New Jersey
Tisch School of the Arts alumni
African-American cinematographers